Petralthan Pillaiya is a 1966 Indian Tamil-language drama film directed by Krishnan–Panju and written by Aaroor Dass. The film stars M. G. Ramachandran, B. Saroja Devi and Sowcar Janaki. Based on Charlie Chaplin's 1921 American film, The Kid, it revolves around a tramp finding a homeless boy and raising him as his own son until five years later the boy's biological parents try to find him.

Petralthan Pillaiya was released on 9 December 1966. The film emerged a commercial success, running for over 100 days in theatres.

Plot 

Jeeva is a mother unable to afford the cost of raising a young boy. She abandons him in a temple where a tramp, Anandhan, discovers him. Anandhan tries to get rid of the boy, but he eventually becomes attached to him. Anandhan names the boy Kannan and educates him, despite his poor financial condition. Five years later, Jeeva, her husband Sekhar and social services try to find her son.

Cast 
 M. G. Ramachandran as Anandhan
 B. Saroja Devi as Mohini
 Sowcar Janaki as Jeeva
 M. R. Radha as Kabali
 S. A. Ashokan as Sekhar
 K. A. Thangavelu as Panjavarnam
 M. N. Nambiar as Mani
 T. S. Balaiah as the old policeman
 Baby Shakila as Kannan
 Indira Devi as Kala
 Mohana

Production 
Petralthan Pillaiya is based on Charlie Chaplin's 1921 American film, The Kid. Writer Aaroor Dass initially narrated the story to Sivaji Ganesan, who seemed interested but "did not follow up"; he later gave it to M. G. Ramachandran. The duo Krishnan–Panju (R. Krishnan and S. Panju) directed the film, and Panju edited the film under the alias S. Panjabi. It was produced by K. K. Vasu under the banner Sri Muthukumaran Pictures, and photographed by P. N. Sundaram. M. R. Radha paid  to Vasu, and acted in the film without charging. Principal photography began in June 1964. Petralthan Pillaiya remains the only film produced by Vasu.

Soundtrack 
M. S. Viswanathan composed the soundtrack The lyrics were written by Vaali. The song "Nalla Nalla Pillaigalai" had to be modified after the censor board objected to the lyric "Arignar Annappol" (Like Anna, the scholar), a reference to the politician C. N. Annadurai. This was changed to "Thiru Vi Ka pol" (Like Thiru Vi Ka), a reference to the scholar and activist Thiru. V. Kalyanasundaram.

Release and reception 
Petralthan Pillaiya was released on 9 December 1966. Kalki said the film was strictly for those who would prefer affection towards children over love. The film emerged a commercial success, running for over 100 days in theatres.

Notes

References

Bibliography

External links 
 

1960s Tamil-language films
1966 drama films
1966 films
Films directed by Krishnan–Panju
Films scored by M. S. Viswanathan
Indian drama films
Indian remakes of American films